19 Arietis (abbreviated 19 Ari) is a star in the northern constellation of Aries. 19 Arietis is the Flamsteed designation. It has an apparent visual magnitude of 5.70, which means it is faintly visible to the naked eye. At that distance, the brightness of the star is diminished by 0.21 in magnitude from extinction caused by interstellar gas and dust.

This is a red giant star with a stellar classification of M0 III. It is a semi-regular variable with periods of 32 and 275 days; the brightness of the star changes by an amplitude of 0.14 in magnitude during those intervals. At the estimated distance of Delta Ophiuchi, this yields a physical size of about 39 times the radius of the Sun. The effective temperature of the outer envelope is 3,690 K, giving it the cool reddish glow of an M-type star.

References

External links
 HR 648
 Image 19 Arietis

013596
010328
Arietis, 19
Aries (constellation)
M-type giants
Durchmusterung objects
0648
Suspected variables